Lisztomania is a 1975 British surreal biographical musical comedy film written and directed by Ken Russell about the 19th-century composer Franz Liszt. The screenplay is derived, in part, from the book Nélida by Marie d'Agoult (1848), about her affair with Liszt.

Depicting the flamboyant Liszt as the first classical pop star, Lisztomania features contemporary rock star Roger Daltrey (of The Who) as Franz Liszt. The film was released the same year as Tommy, which also starred Daltrey and was also directed by Russell. Rick Wakeman, from the progressive rock band Yes, composed the Lisztomania soundtrack, which included synthesiser arrangements of works by Liszt and Richard Wagner. He also appears in the film as Thor, the Nordic god of thunder. Daltrey and Russell wrote the lyrics for the soundtrack, and Daltrey provided vocals. Of the other rock celebrities appearing in the film, Ringo Starr appears as the Pope.

The term Lisztomania was coined by the German romantic literary figure Heinrich Heine to describe the massive public response to Liszt's virtuosic piano performances. At these performances, there were allegedly screaming women, and the audience sometimes was limited to standing room only.

This film was first to use the new Dolby Stereo sound system.

Synopsis

Rather than presenting a straightforward narrative, the film tells of Liszt's life through a series of surrealistic episodes blending fact and fantasy, and full of anachronistic elements. At the start of the film, Liszt is caught in bed with Marie d'Agoult by her husband, the Count d'Agoult. The count challenges Liszt to a fight with sabres, but Marie begs the count to let her share Liszt's fate. The count then orders his staff to trap Liszt and Marie into the body of a piano, nailing it shut, and then leaving it on railroad tracks.

The scene then is shown to be a flashback triggered by the camera flash of photographers backstage before one of Liszt's concerts. Richard Wagner appears, and Liszt introduces him to his circle of colleagues, including Gioachino Rossini, Hector Berlioz, Frédéric Chopin, and Hans von Bülow. Liszt then pays Wagner to allow him to perform a variation on a theme from Rienzi. At the concert, Wagner is put off by Liszt's crowd-pleasing showmanship at the expense of serious musicianship, which includes his adding the melody of Chopsticks to his Rienzi variation. However, the crowd, consisting entirely of young screaming girls, go wild at Liszt's performance, storming the stage. Liszt uses von Bülow to proposition potentially wealthy females in the audience during his performance. One of them is Princess Carolyn, who relays to Liszt her address in Russia.

The next scene shows Marie's and Liszt's domestic life plagued by jealousy over his constant touring and his infidelities. At this point, they have three children, the oldest being Cosima. Domestic life has strained Liszt's creativity. Liszt prepares to depart to St. Petersburg to play for the tsar. Marie threatens to abandon him if he decides to go. Liszt then suggests to Cosima that he would sell his soul to the devil to compose brilliant music again. As Liszt is leaving, Cosima consoles him that she will pray to God every day, so that Liszt will meet the devil and be able to sell his soul to him.

In Russia, Liszt meets Princess Carolyn at her court. She begins to seduce him, offering him the ability to compose the brilliant music he wanted in exchange for total control of his life. In one of the more ostentatious scenes of the movie, Liszt then experiences a hallucination where the women of Princess Carolyn's court assail him but then become seduced by his music, which strokes his libido and gives him a 10-foot erection. Carolyn sinisterly observes from afar as the women celebrate his giant erection with a chorus line. The women then drag Liszt and his erection to a guillotine in which Carolyn reveals that the bargain for Liszt's newfound musical prolificity is the forfeiture of his libertinism.

The next scene shows Liszt in Dresden during the May Uprising, conflicted about not supporting his friends in the revolt and spending all his time isolated to compose music (it is heavily implied that Marie and his two youngest children have been killed). Wagner, now a political criminal on the lam, reappears and asks Liszt for money so that he can escape the country with his family. As Liszt tends Wagner's wounds, Wagner secretly drugs Liszt, who passes out. Wagner then reveals himself to be a vampire with a mission to write music that will inspire a new German nationalism. He then proceeds to suck Liszt's blood and compose on the piano. Before departing, Wagner leaves him his latest political pamphlet, a Superman comic (a play on Friedrich Nietzsche's Superman).

Liszt and Carolyn travel to the Vatican to get married after the pope agrees to grant her a divorce from her husband. The wedding ultimately is voided by the intervention of her husband and the tsar. Furious at the pope's political impotence, Carolyn threatens to write an anthology on her disagreements with the church (Causes intérieures de la faiblesse extérieure de l'Église en 1870). Liszt then proposes that he will join the church as an abbot.

Liszt's life as an abbot is shown to be disobedient as he is caught in bed with a woman. The pope then explains that Wagner has seduced Cosima as his wife and has begun to lead a devilish cult organised around his music. He orders Liszt to travel to Wagner's castle to exorcise him and return him to the Christian faith or else Liszt will be excommunicated and his music banned.

Liszt travels to Wagner's castle, where he observes a secret ritual portraying a devilish Jew raping several blonde-haired Germanic nymphs. Wagner then appears with Cosima, dressed in Superman outfits, and sings how "the flowering youth of Germany was raped by 'the beast'" and that a "new messiah" will soon arrive to drive out the beast. At the conclusion of the song, Cosima marches the audience, composed entirely of children, out with a Nazi salute as they chant that they "will be the master race".

Liszt confronts Wagner, who is unaware of what Liszt has seen, and inquires about his ambitions. Wagner confesses that he has been building a mechanical Viking Siegfried to rid the country of Jews. When Wagner awakens Siegfried with his music, the creature turns out to be crass and slow-witted. Liszt sneaks holy water into Wagner's drink, but the water has no effect. Wagner then reveals himself to Liszt as a vampire and threatens to steal his music so that Wagner's Viking can live. Liszt rushes to the piano and plays music, exorcising Wagner and bringing him to near death. Cosima, witnessing Wagner's moribund state, imprisons Liszt and then resurrects Wagner in a Nazi ceremony as a Frankenstein-Hitler wielding a machine-gun guitar. Trapped, Liszt observes as Cosima leads the Wagner-Hitler to gun down the town's Jews, after which she kills Liszt by stabbing a needle through the heart of a voodoo doll made in his likeness.

In heaven, Liszt is reunited with the women he has romanced in his life and Cosima, but it never is explained how she got there after killing Liszt, who regret their behaviour toward him and each other and finally live in harmony. In the final episode, Liszt and the women decide to fly to Earth in a spaceship to destroy Wagner-Hitler who has now ravaged Berlin in a fiery machine-gun frenzy. Once Wagner-Hitler is destroyed, Liszt sings that he has found "peace at last".

Cast

The cast featured cameos by actors from director Ken Russell's recurring ensemble, making brief appearances as other well known composers, including: Murray Melvin as Hector Berlioz, Andrew Faulds as Johann Strauss II, Kenneth Colley as Frédéric Chopin (credited as Ken Colley, as in his other Russell works), and Otto Diamant as Felix Mendelssohn.

Production
David Puttnam's company Goodtimes planned to make a series of six films about composers, all to be directed by Ken Russell. Subjects were to include Franz Liszt, George Gershwin, Berlioz and Vaughan Williams; the first one was Mahler (1974), which had been a minor success. In July 1974, Russell said he wanted Mick Jagger to play Liszt because Liszt had been "the first pop star".

Puttnam says he wanted to follow it with a biopic of Gershwin starring Al Pacino but claims Russell just made Tommy and wanted to make a film about Liszt with Roger Daltrey. Russell wrote he had written films about both Liszt and Gershwin—the latter was called The Gershwin Dream and it was Puttnam who chose Liszt; Russell say this was "probably" because Russell wanted to play Liszt.

In October 1974, Russell announced Roger Daltrey would play Liszt. "Liszt's music is just like modern day rock," said Daltrey in November. "He was a lot like me... he had this religious thing like me but he still went lusting after women." "Roger is a natural, brilliant performer," said Russell. "He acts as he sings and the results are magical. He also has a curious quality of innocence which is why he was a perfect Tommy and why he is the only person to play Liszt."

In December 1974, Mayfair announced it signed a deal to distribute five films made by Russell and Goodtimes started with one on Liszt.

In February 1975 Russell said Marty Feldman was to play Wagner. The same month, the title was changed from Liszt to Lisztomania.

Filming
Puttnam said "The problem was he [Russell] never finished his screenplay, and frankly, he just seemed to go off his rocker." Russell said he was most intrigued by Liszt's relationship with Wagner, but Puttnam "was more at home at a pop concert than in the concert hall. He threw out my first script for being too straight and urged me to write another emphasising the pop element."

Press materials claimed Russell's script was 57 pages.

Russell later wrote that "I was playing Trilby to his [Puttnam's] Svengali". He claims it was Puttnam who suggested Ringo Starr play a supporting role, got Rick Wakeman to do the music, and suggested Russell go anamorphic.

Daltrey said he found the part difficult because he had no lines in Tommy and could not play the piano.

Puttnam said "the film was rocketing over budget and every time I got back from raising money, the budget had gone up again. I did my best but it was a nightmare, impossible to keep up with."

Sandy Lieberson of Goodtimes said Russell "went off the deep end" forcing Lieberson and Puttnam to put their own money into the film.

"The film's going to be like Tom Jones riding in Blazing Saddles," said Russell.

Reception

Critical
Roger Ebert of the Chicago Sun-Times gave the film three out of four stars and called it "a berserk exercise of demented genius, and on that level (I want to make my praise explicit) it functions and sometimes even works. Most people will probably despise it." Richard Eder of The New York Times wrote that for the first half-hour the film is "manic and extremely funny. Then it relapses into a noisy bit of pretentiousness in the manner of its predecessor, Tommy full of flashing lights, satin spacesuits, chrome-lucite furniture and mock agony." Gene Siskel of the Chicago Tribune gave the film one star out of four and wrote that "Russell fills the screen with enough outlandish sexual imagery to render one's senses numb. The film's publicists would have you believe Lisztomania is outrageous; on the contrary, it's just boring." Kevin Thomas of the Los Angeles Times called it "a buoyant, consistently coherent and imaginative film that is alternately—and sometimes simultaneously—outrageous, hilarious and poignant." Gary Arnold of The Washington Post wrote that "it becomes painfully evident that Russell, the Great Vulgarian of contemporary filmmaking, should have quit while he was ahead, sort of. A boudoir-farce approach to the life and legend of Liszt would have been trivial-minded, but harmlessly trivial-minded compared to the collection of obscene fantasies and gassy profundities Russell resorts to after his muse runs out of comic ideas." Pauline Kael wrote "In a couple of sequences, it erupts successfully with a wholehearted, comic-strip craziness, but for all his lashing himself into a slapstick fury, the director Ken Russell can't seem to pull the elements of film making together."

In a review for Die Zeit, Hans-Christoph Blumenberg summed up the film as follows:

Another German reviewer, Hans J. Wulff devoted a six-page article to the film, and commented:

Leonard Maltin's Movie Guide gave the film one and a half stars out of four, while the Golden Movie Retriever said "WOOF!"

The film holds a 50% rating on Rotten Tomatoes, based on 10 reviews.

Russell later said "he got off on the wrong foot" with the film which "called for a bigger budget than we had so the film doesn't work as well as I wanted it to. The symbolism moreover is a bit too relentless and the fantasy sequences tend to submerge the reality of the characters. I think I had exhausted the vein of biographies of composers at the time."

Box office
The film was a box-office flop and ended the plans for Goodtimes Enterprises to make more films with Russell.

References

Notes

External links 
 
 
 

1975 films
British musical films
British biographical films
British avant-garde and experimental films
Musical films based on actual events
Films directed by Ken Russell
Films about classical music and musicians
Films about composers
Films about pianos and pianists
Biographical films about musicians
Rock operas
British rock music films
Cultural depictions of Franz Liszt
Cultural depictions of Richard Wagner
Warner Bros. films
1970s musical films
Films set in Germany
Films set in the 19th century
Films produced by David Puttnam
Films scored by Rick Wakeman
1970s dance films
1970s English-language films
1970s British films